The Giro del Piemonte, since 2009 known also as Gran Piemonte, is a semi classic European bicycle race held in the Apennine Mountains, Italy. The race first took place in 1906. Since 2005, the race has been organised as a 1.HC event on the UCI Europe Tour. It is usually held a few days before the more important race Giro di Lombardia.

In 2007, the race was not ridden because of sponsorship problems, but in 2008 it was back again.

The 2013 edition was again cancelled due to financial problems.

Winners

Wins per country

References

External links

UCI Europe Tour races
Cycle races in Italy
Classic cycle races
Recurring sporting events established in 1906
1906 establishments in Italy
Sport in Piedmont
Giro del Piemonte